Piz Alv is a mountain of the Lepontine Alps in Switzerland. The summit is the tripoint between the cantons of Uri (Unteralp valley), Graubünden (Val Maighels) and Ticino (Val Canaria).

References

External links
 Piz Alv on Hikr

Mountains of the Alps
Mountains of Switzerland
Mountains of Graubünden
Mountains of Ticino
Mountains of the canton of Uri
Graubünden–Ticino border
Graubünden–Uri border
Ticino–Uri border
Lepontine Alps
Two-thousanders of Switzerland
Andermatt
Tujetsch
Airolo